Laurence Jackson School is a coeducational secondary school located in Guisborough, North Yorkshire, England. It has a capacity of 1,250 pupils.

The school's headteacher is Catherine Juckes.

A 2019 Ofsted inspection judged Laurence Jackson School as inadequate in all aspects, including achievement, teaching, behaviour of pupils, leadership and overall effectiveness. Laurence Jackson School joined the Vision Academy Trust in 2020.

New building
In 2014 it was confirmed that a state-of-the-art new school building would replace the ageing facility then in place. In May 2014 Miller Construction was contracted for the design and construction of the school as well as maintenance and life-cycle services for 25 years.
The build was then taken over by the Priority School Building Programme (PSBP) and the new building, built by Galliford Try, was open to students in September 2016.

Notable pupils
Bob Champion, jockey
Paul Drinkhall, table tennis player
Rod Liddle, journalist
Selina Scott, TV presenter and journalist
Connor Simpson, footballer

References

External links

 Laurence Jackson School web site

Secondary schools in Redcar and Cleveland
Academies in Redcar and Cleveland
Guisborough